= Thibi =

Coordinates: 16°01′N 49°00′E

- Interactive map of Thibi
- Country: Yemen
- Governorate: Hadhramaut
- Time zone: UTC+3 (Yemen Standard Time)

Thibi is a village in eastern Yemen. It is located in the Hadhramaut Governorate.
